Kočarji (sometimes Kožarji) is a settlement in the hills southeast of the town of Kočevje in southern Slovenia. The area is part of the traditional region of Lower Carniola and is now included in the Southeast Slovenia Statistical Region.

Church

The local church, dedicated to Saint Ambrose, was first mentioned in documents dating to 1526. Only its foundation is left today.

References

External links

Kočarji on Geopedia
Pre–World War II map of Kočarji with oeconyms and family names

Populated places in the Municipality of Kočevje